The 1882 United States House of Representatives elections in South Carolina were held on November 7, 1882 to select seven Representatives for two-year terms from the state of South Carolina.  Following the 1880 Census, the state was granted two additional seats in the House of Representatives.  The Democratic controlled state legislature drew the districts to maximize the white vote and limit the black vote.  Much of the black population was packed into the 7th congressional district which resulted in the other six congressional districts being evenly split between the races.  The Democratic plan achieved its desired effect and the composition of the state delegation after the election was six Democrats and one Republican.

1st congressional district
The 1st congressional district shifted from the Pee Dee region to the central part of the state and it also included the city of Charleston.  Samuel Dibble was nominated by the Democrats and defeated J.B. Campbell, a fusion candidate of the Greenback-Labor and Republican parties.

General election results

|-
| bgcolor="#0BDA51" |
| Greenback-Labor
| J.B. Campbell 
| align="right" | 6,565
| align="right" | 43.1
| align="right" | +6.4
|-

|-
| 
| colspan=5 |Democratic hold
|-

2nd congressional district
The 2nd congressional district shifted from Charleston to the lower western counties of the state.  George D. Tillman, the former Democratic Representative of the 5th congressional district, defeated E.M. Brayton, a fusion candidate of the Greenback-Labor and Republican parties.

General election results

|-
| bgcolor="#0BDA51" |
| Greenback-Labor
| E.M. Brayton 
| align="right" | 5,361
| align="right" | 31.9
| align="right" | -9.3
|-

|-
| 
| colspan=5 |Democratic gain from Republican
|-

3rd congressional district
The 3rd congressional district remained in the northwest part of the state and incumbent Democratic Congressman D. Wyatt Aiken, in office since 1877, defeated T.H. Russell, a fusion candidate of the Greenback-Labor and Republican parties.

General election results

|-
| bgcolor="#0BDA51" |
| Greenback-Labor
| T.H. Russell 
| align="right" | 1,677
| align="right" | 15.4
| align="right" | -10.5
|-

|-
| 
| colspan=5 |Democratic hold
|-

4th congressional district
The 4th congressional district remained in the Greenville-Spartanburg region of the state and incumbent Democratic Congressman John H. Evins, in office since 1877, defeated D.R. Elkins, a fusion candidate of the Greenback-Labor and Republican parties.

General election results

|-
| bgcolor="#0BDA51" |
| Greenback-Labor
| D.R. Elkins
| align="right" | 4,588
| align="right" | 28.2
| align="right" | -2.1
|-

|-
| 
| colspan=5 |Democratic hold
|-

5th congressional district
The 5th congressional district shifted from the southwestern part of the state to the northern central part of the state.  John J. Hemphill was nominated by the Democrats and defeated E.B.C. Cash, a fusion candidate of the Greenback-Labor and Republican parties.

General election results

|-
| bgcolor="#0BDA51" |
| Greenback-Labor
| E.B.C. Cash
| align="right" | 7,471
| align="right" | 44.0
| align="right" | +4.4
|-

|-
| 
| colspan=5 |Democratic gain from Republican
|-

6th congressional district
The 6th congressional district was created to cover the Pee Dee region of the state.  George W. Dargan was nominated by the Democrats and defeated the Greenback-Labor and Republican candidates in the general election.

General election results

|-
| bgcolor="#0BDA51" |
| Greenback-Labor
| A.H. Bowen
| align="right" | 2,263
| align="right" | 13.6
| align="right" | N/A
|-

|-
| 
| colspan=5 |Democratic gain
|-

7th congressional district
The 7th congressional district became known as the black district because it was gerrymandered in such a way to include the great bulk of the black population.  Republican Edmund William McGregor Mackey defeated Independent Republican challenger Samuel Lee in the general election.

General election results

|-
| bgcolor="#FF3333" |
| Independent Republican
| Samuel Lee
| align="right" | 10,017
| align="right" | 35.2
| align="right" | N/A
|-

|-
| 
| colspan=5 |Republican gain
|-

See also
United States House of Representatives elections, 1882
South Carolina gubernatorial election, 1882
South Carolina's congressional districts

References
"Report of the Secretary of State to the General Assembly of South Carolina." Reports and Resolutions of the General Assembly of the State of South Carolina. Columbia, SC: Charles A. Calvo, Jr., 1883, p. 1760.

South Carolina
1882